Odostomia wareni is a species of sea snail, a marine gastropod mollusk in the family Pyramidellidae, the pyrams and their allies.

Description
The slender, white to transparent shell has a nearly cylindrical shape with an obtuse apex. Its length measures 1.7 mm. The whorls of the protoconch are intorted. The teleoconch contains 3½ rounded whorls. The suture is well marked. The growth lines are somewhat prosocline (i.e. with the growth lines leaning forward (adapically) with respect to the direction of the cone) and not strongly marked. The sculpture of the surface is smooth and shiny. The outer lip is thin. There is no umbilicus. The columellar tooth is weak and is deeply seated inside the pyriform aperture.

Distribution
This species occurs in the Atlantic Ocean in the following locations:
 Cape Verdes
 Ghana
 São Tomé and Principe Archipelagos
 Senegal

References

External links
 To Encyclopedia of Life
 

wareni
Gastropods described in 1994
Molluscs of the Atlantic Ocean
Gastropods of Cape Verde
Invertebrates of West Africa
Invertebrates of São Tomé and Príncipe